Gari and beans is a type of dish made of staple foods in Ghana. It is usually common in the southern parts of Ghana popularly called bober, borbor or gobe, yo ke gari and even red red.

Ingredients 

 beans (black eyed )
 ripped plantain (red red)
 palm oil
 onion
 tomato
 gari
 chilli
 avocado
 boiled egg

How it is made 

 soak beans overnight and boil it till it softens 
 heat palm oil with onions in sauce pan to add flavour
 measure a spoonful of gari to mix evenly
 add the palm oil and mix evenly
 serve with fried plantain and egg or sliced avocado as a preference
 vegetables maybe added

Nutritional significance 
Gari and beans is very nutritious, gari is starch rich and serves as source of energy. Beans has a considerable amount of iron and protein. The staple make up a complete protein providing the body with essential minerals.

See also 

 Ghanaian cuisine

External links 

 Video:How to prepare Ghanaian style red red, black eye beans and Gari

References 

Ghanaian cuisine
African cuisine